Dissodactylus mellitae, the sand-dollar pea crab, is a species of pea crab in the family Pinnotheridae. It is found in the western Atlantic Ocean.

References

Further reading

 

decapods
Articles created by Qbugbot
Crustaceans described in 1900